The 1965–66 OB I bajnokság season was the 29th season of the OB I bajnokság, the top level of ice hockey in Hungary. Eight teams participated in the league, and Ujpesti Dozsa SC won the championship.

First round

Second round

Final round

Placing round

External links
 Season on hockeyarchives.info

Hun
OB I bajnoksag seasons
1965–66 in Hungarian ice hockey